Rabbit Test may refer to:

 Rabbit test, a pregnancy test
 "Rabbit Test" (Ugly Betty), a 2009 television episode starring America Ferrera
 Rabbit Test (film), a 1978 movie starring Billy Crystal